Desmoncus polyacanthos, the jacitara palm, is a spiny, climbing palm native to the southern Caribbean and tropical South America.  Stems grow clustered together, and are 2–12 m long and 0.5–2 cm in diameter.  Petioles, rachis, cirrus and peduncular bracts are covered with short, curved spines.  Two varieties are recognised: D. polyacanthos var. polyacanthos and D. polyacanthos var. prunifer (Poepp. ex Mart.) A.J.Hend.

Desmoncus polyacanthos is found in Colombia, Venezuela, Saint Vincent and the Grenadines, Trinidad and Tobago, Guyana, Suriname, French Guiana, Brazil, Bolivia, Ecuador and Peru.  The stems are used for baskets and sieves.

References

polyacanthos
Trees of Trinidad and Tobago
Trees of South America
Palms of French Guiana